The Spinulosida are an order of sea stars containing at least 120 species in seven genera and one family.

Spinulosids completely lack pedicellariae and have a delicate skeletal arrangement. Their name comes from the presence of numerous low spines on the aboral (upper) surface. No fossil spinulosids have yet been found.

Taxonomy
The following family is recognised by the World Register of Marine Species:

 Echinasteridae Verrill, 1870

References

 
Echinoderm orders